Cyclone is an unincorporated community in McKean County, Pennsylvania, United States.

The community was so named on account of a cyclone (tornado) which struck the area.

References

Unincorporated communities in Pennsylvania
Unincorporated communities in McKean County, Pennsylvania